A nuclear scandal took place in South Korea, when the country faced a series of shutdowns, of nuclear reactors because of fake documents. The documents dated back to 2012. South Korea itself depends heavily on nuclear power.

Investigation

During November 2012, two nuclear reactors were suspended by the country after discovering that the parts were supplied with fake certificates.

On 10 October 2013, South Korea indicted about 100 people, which included a top former state utility official with the charges of scandal. Officials further noted that they will bring back into compliance those reactors that were suspended for inspection and replacement of parts.

On 7 February 2014, the Nuclear Safety and Security Commission declared that its investigation since mid-2013, they found eight cases out of 2,075 samples of foreign manufactured reactor components that were supplied with fake documents. Although the names of dealing countries remains undisclosed.

See also
Nuclear power in South Korea
Corruption in South Korea
Anti-nuclear movement in South Korea
One Less Nuclear Power Plant
Tokyo Electric Power Company#Safety incidents
Nuclear and radiation accidents

References

External links
Scandal may cause South Korea to abandon nuclear power

Corruption in South Korea
Nuclear power in South Korea
Corporate scandals